The following is a refined list of Levantive archeological periods, expanded from the basic three-age system with finer subdivisions and extension into the modern historical period (note: "BP" = "Before Present"). The particular dates selected as the boundary between ages, as well as the period names for the historical era, are specific to Levantine archaeology and therefore are most accurate for that context. Beginning and ending dates of prehistoric ages are based on the introduction and prevalence of certain technologies, which varied from culture to culture; similarly, historical eras are named after cultures in the area of influence in which the Levant was included. However, archaeologists studying other regions have sometimes found it useful to use the same or a similar system of eras for their topics of research (particularly for prehistoric eras), and thus this list can be used to represent the archaeological periods of areas more general than the Near East.

See also
List of archaeological excavations by date
List of archaeological periods - parent page

References
"BAESL Archaeological Period Codes". Stewart Library at Weber State University; adapted from The New Encyclopedia of Archaeological Excavations In the Holy Land (Jerusalem and New York, 1993). Retrieved August 6, 2005.
"Chronology of the Wadi Arabah". Wadi Arabah Project. Retrieved November 2, 2005.

Archaeology-related lists
Levant
History of the Levant
Levantine archaeology